Silana may refer to the following places:
 Silana (Thessaly), a town in ancient Histiaeotis, Thessaly, Greece
 Silana, Sorath, a village and former princely state in Kathiawar, Gujarat, India
 Silana, Sonipat, a village in Haryana, India